Taşkın Aksoy (born 13 June 1967) is a German football manager and former player. He is the manager of Turkish club Gençlerbirliği.

Playing career
Aksoy began his career at Hertha BSC. Making his debut in 1986, he went on to make 36 appearances for the Olympic Stadium-based side. Having moved to Boluspor, he came back to his native Berlin to sign for Türkiyemspor. Aksoy played for Tennis Borussia Berlin between 1993 and 1997, scoring 11 goals in 115 games. After a disagreement with coach Hermann Gerland, Aksoy decided to leave Tennis Borussia and after receiving an offer from Süper Lig team Kocaelispor, moved to Turkey where he played 15 games for the İzmit outfit. Aksoy played a season at Kayserispor before being called up for military service. In an effort to defer it, Aksoy moved back to Berlin again and signed for TeBe. Unfit for first team football, Aksoy trained with the reserve team for a while before later going on to make 43 further appearances as Tennis Borussia were relegated twice in successive seasons. Aksoy saw out the remainder of his playing career at fellow Berliners SV Yeşilyurt before retiring in 2004.

Managerial career
In 2007, Aksoy earned his UEFA Pro Licence and began coaching Berliner AK 07 in the NOFV-Oberliga. From the summer of 2009 until 11 October 2010, he had been the manager of Türkiyemspor Berlin. since the beginning of the 2012–13 season, he has been coaching the reserve team of Fortuna Düsseldorf in the Regionalliga West.

He was named the interim coach of the first team on 13 April 2015.

References

External links
 
 

1967 births
Living people
Footballers from Berlin
German people of Turkish descent
German footballers
Association football defenders
Hertha BSC players
Boluspor footballers
Türkiyemspor Berlin players
Tennis Borussia Berlin players
Kocaelispor footballers
Kayserispor footballers
SV Yeşilyurt players
Regionalliga players
Oberliga (football) players
2. Bundesliga players
Süper Lig players
German expatriate footballers
Expatriate footballers in Turkey
German expatriate sportspeople in Turkey
German football managers
Fortuna Düsseldorf managers
Gençlerbirliği S.K. managers
Regionalliga managers
2. Bundesliga managers
Süper Lig managers
German expatriate football managers
Expatriate football managers in Turkey